Kayse Marie Shrum (born October 27, 1972) is an American physician and the President of Oklahoma State University–Stillwater. She is the first woman to lead a public research institution in Oklahoma. She was selected as OSU's 19th president in April 2021 and took office on July 1, 2021.

Early life and education
Shrum was born on October 27, 1972, in Coweta, Oklahoma. She graduated from Connors State College, a community college in Warner, Oklahoma. She played softball for Connors State and graduated in 1992. She continued her education at Northeastern State University and the University of Arkansas before graduating with a doctorate of osteopathic medicine from the Oklahoma State University College of Osteopathic Medicine.

Career 
Shrum practiced pediatrics in Muskogee, Oklahoma before joining the faculty of the medical school faculty at the OSU Center for Health Sciences in 2002.  She served as chair of the Department of Pediatrics from 2004 to 2011. In 2011, OSU College of Osteopathic Medicine named her provost of OSU-CHS and dean of the OSU College of Osteopathic Medicine. She was promoted to president of OSU-CHS, becoming the youngest and first female president and dean of a medical school in the state of Oklahoma. In April 2021 she was named the president of Oklahoma State University, and assumed this role in July 2021. Shrum succeeded V. Burns Hargis who announced his retirement plans in October 2020.

Awards
Shrum holds the George Kaiser Family Foundation chair in medical excellence and service and the Saint Francis Health System endowed chair of pediatrics. She was inducted into the Oklahoma Women's Hall of Fame in 2022.

Personal life 
Shrum is married to Darren Shrum. They have six children.

References 

Living people
American pediatricians
American osteopathic physicians
Heads of universities and colleges in the United States
Women heads of universities and colleges
Oklahoma State University faculty
Presidents of Oklahoma State University
Connors State College alumni
Northeastern State University alumni
University of Arkansas alumni
Oklahoma State University alumni
Women pediatricians
People from Coweta, Oklahoma
1972 births